Xəlfələr or Khalfalar or Khal’fyalyar may refer to:
 Xəlfələr, Davachi, Azerbaijan
 Xəlfələr, Masally, Azerbaijan